Hendersonida is a monotypic genus of squat lobsters in the family Munididae. Its only member is H. granulata. The genus name is in reference to John Robertson Henderson.

References

Squat lobsters